Northsea Nights is a live album by American jazz guitarist Joe Pass and double bassist Niels-Henning Ørsted Pedersen that was released in 1980.

Track listing
"If I Were a Bell" (Frank Loesser) – 7:02
"'Round Midnight" (Thelonious Monk, Cootie Williams) – 9:28
"How Deep is the Ocean?" (Irving Berlin) – 6:12
"Stella by Starlight" (Victor Young, Ned Washington) – 8:38
"I Can't Get Started" (Ira Gershwin, Vernon Duke) – 7:08
"Blues for the Hague" (Joe Pass, Niels-Henning Ørsted Pedersen) – 6:57

Personnel
 Joe Pass – guitar
 Niels-Henning Ørsted Pedersen – double bass

Chart positions

References

External links
Joe Pass Memorial Hall

Joe Pass live albums
Albums produced by Norman Granz
1979 live albums
Pablo Records live albums